The Seal of Solomon or Ring of Solomon is the legendary signet ring attributed to the Israelite king Solomon in medieval mystical traditions, from which it developed in parallel within Jewish mysticism, Islamic mysticism and Western occultism.

It is often depicted in the shape of either a pentagram or a hexagram. Due to the proverbial wisdom of Solomon, it came to be seen as an amulet or talisman, or a symbol or character in medieval magic and Renaissance magic, occultism, and alchemy.

The seal is the predecessor to the Star of David, a Jewish symbol, and in modern vexillology, it features on the Flag of Israel. The pentagram on the Flag of Morocco also represents the seal.

History

The earliest references to Solomon's seal / signet stem from within Jewish traditions. It is  first mentioned  by the first-century Jewish historian Josephus, and is similarly referenced by the third-century Jewish magical text Sefer HaRazim and then again finds expression in an aggadic section of the Tractate Gittin within the Babylonian Talmud as well. In parallel a first century Greek manual of Judeo-Christian magic known as Testament of Solomon also makes reference to the Seal of Solomon.

The tradition of Solomon's Seal later made its way into Islamic Arab sources, as Gershom Scholem (the founder of the modern, academic study of Kabbalah) attests "It is difficult to say for how long certain definite names have been used for several of the most common seals. The Arabs made many such terms especially popular, but just the names Seal of Solomon and Shield of David, which are often used interchangeably for the two emblems, go back to pre-Islamic Jewish magic. They did not originate among the Arabs who, incidentally, know only the designation Seal of Solomon."

The legend of the Seal of Solomon was developed primarily by medieval Middle Eastern writers, who related that the ring was engraved by God and was given to the king directly from heaven. The ring was made from brass and iron, and the two parts were used to seal written commands to good and evil spirits, respectively. In one tale, a demon — either Asmodeus or Sakhr — obtained possession of the ring and ruled in Solomon's stead for forty days. In a variant of the  tale of the ring of Polycrates from Herodotus, the demon eventually threw the ring into the sea, where it was swallowed by a fish, caught by a charitable fisherman, who unknowingly fed it to the displaced Solomon, restoring him to power.

The date of origin legends surrounding the Seal of Solomon is difficult to establish. 
A legend of a magic ring with which the possessor could command demons was already current in the 1st century (Josephus telling of one Eleazar who used such a ring in the presence of Vespasian), but the association of the name of Solomon with such a ring is likely medieval notwithstanding the 2nd century apocryphal text the Testament of Solomon. The Tractate Gittin (fol. 68) of the Talmud has a story involving Solomon, Asmodeus, and a ring with the divine name engraved: Solomon gives the ring and a chain to one Benaiahu son of Jehoiada to catch the demon Ashmedai, to obtain the demon's help to build the temple; Ashmedai later tricks Solomon into giving him the ring and swallows it.

The specification of the design of the seal as a hexagram seems to arise from a medieval Arab tradition, and most scholars assume that the symbol entered the Kabbalistic tradition of medieval Spain from Arabic literature. The representation as a pentagram, by contrast, seems to arise in the Western tradition of Renaissance magic (which was in turn strongly influenced by medieval Arab and Jewish occultism); W. Kennett (1660–1728) makes reference to a "pentangle of Solomon" with the power of exorcising demons.

Hexagrams feature prominently in Jewish esoteric literature from the early medieval period, and it has been hypothesized that the tradition of Solomon's Seal may possibly predate Islam and date to early Rabbinical esoteric tradition, or to early alchemy in Hellenistic Judaism in 3rd century Egypt.

The seal appears profusely in the decoration of the 17th-century Catholic Sacromonte Abbey, in Granada, Spain, as a symbol of wisdom. The Seal of was also discovered in Palestine during the Ottoman period, when it was etched in stone above windows and doors and on Muslim tombs. A few examples were found in houses in Saris and on graves in Jaffa.

An "Order of the Seal of Solomon" was established in 1874 in Ethiopia, where the ruling house claimed descent from Solomon.

Other traditions
In Islamic eschatology, some believe that the Beast of the Earth, which should appear near the Last Judgment day, will come bearing "the Seal of Solomon", and will use the latter to stamp the noses of the unbelievers.

Use in vexillology

In 1354, King of Bohemia Charles IV prescribed for the Jews of Prague a red flag with both David's shield and Solomon's seal, while the red flag with which the Jews met King Matthias of Hungary in the 15th century showed two pentagrams with two golden stars.

The pentagram on the Flag of Morocco is meant to represent the seal, as well as the five pillars of Islam.

The hexagram or Star of David, which became a symbol of Judaism in the modern period and was placed on the flag of Israel in 1948, has its origins in 14th century depictions of the Seal of Solomon.

In popular culture
Lippmann Moses Büschenthal  (d. 1818) wrote a tragedy with the title Der Siegelring Salomonis ("the signet-ring of Solomon").

Footnotes

See also
Goetia
Key of Solomon
The Lesser Key of Solomon
Polygonatum multiflorum, plant from the lily family named "Solomon's seal"
Seal of Muhammad
Sigil (magic)
Solomon's knot
Solomon's Seal (album)
Testament of Solomon

References

External links
 

Amulets
Seals (insignia)
Demonology
Magic rings
Magic symbols
Medieval legends
Talismans
Testament of Solomon